The Leader of the Opposition is the politician who leads the official opposition in  the Bihar Legislative Council. Incumbent Leader of opposition is Samrat Chaudhary.

Leaders of the opposition

References 

Bihari politicians
Bihar
Bihar Legislative Council